Emory Healthcare is a health care system in the U.S. state of Georgia. It is part of Emory University and is the largest healthcare system in the state. It comprises 11 hospitals, the Emory Clinic and more than 250 provider locations. Established in 2011, the Emory Healthcare Network is the largest clinically integrated network in Georgia with more than 2,800 physicians concentrating in 70 different subspecialties.

Hospitals
 Emory University Hospital
 Emory University Hospital Midtown
 Emory University Hospital at Wesley Woods
 Emory Johns Creek Hospital
 Emory Saint Joseph's Hospital
 Emory Rehabilitation Hospital
 Emory University Orthopaedics and Spine Hospital
 Emory Decatur Hospital
Emory Hillandale Hospital
Emory Long Term Acute Care

Emory Clinic
Emory Clinic is the outpatient physician practice of the Emory Healthcare system.

Affiliations and partnerships 
Emory Healthcare has relationships with the Atlanta VA Medical Center, Children's Healthcare of Atlanta, Grady Memorial Hospital, and MinuteClinics in the Atlanta area. In 2015, Emory Healthcare's Veterans Program received a $15 million grant from Wounded Warrior Project to expand its outpatient services and become a partner of the Warrior Care Network as a PTSD treatment center.

Awards and recognition
Emory University Hospital (including Emory University Hospital at Wesley Woods and Emory Orthopaedics & Spine Hospital) has ranked #1 in metro Atlanta and in Georgia by U.S. News & World Report from 2012 through 2020.
Emory Healthcare is the only academic medical institution to have had two hospitals ranked in the national top 10 for quality by the University Health System Consortium (UHC). In 2013, Emory University Hospital was ranked #2 and Emory University Hospital Midtown was ranked #3. In 2014, these hospitals remained in the top quartile, with Emory University Hospital ranking #2 and Emory University Hospital Midtown ranking #22.
Winship Cancer Institute of Emory University is Georgia’s only National Cancer Institute-designated cancer center.
Emory University Hospital and Emory Saint Joseph’s Hospital have both received Magnet recognition by the American Nurses Credentialing Center. Emory University Hospital received Magnet accreditation in 2014; the same year Emory Saint Joseph’s Hospital received its fifth consecutive accreditation, making it one of only three hospitals in the world to be accredited five times.
Emory University Hospital was the first hospital in the United States to treat patients with known Ebola virus disease. To date, four patients with Ebola virus disease have been successfully treated at this facility. It has been designated by the White House as one of the country’s Ebola treatment centers.

References 

Healthcare in Georgia (U.S. state)
Companies based in Atlanta
Healthcare
Medical and health organizations based in Georgia (U.S. state)